Ostrozub (Serbian Cyrillic: Острозуб) is a mountain in southern Serbia, near the town of Crna Trava. It forms a continuous range with Čemernik mountain. Its highest peak Ostrozupska čuka has an elevation of 1,546 meters above sea level.

The eponymous village
on the mountain is depopulated. According to the 2002 census, it had a population of 1.

Gallery

References

External links 

 Photo story from Ostrozub

Populated places in Jablanica District
Mountains of Serbia
Crna Trava
Rhodope mountain range